Samal, officially the Municipality of Samal, is a 4th class municipality in the province of Bataan, Philippines. According to the 2020 census, it has a population of 38,302 people.

Etymology
Samal originated from samel, a covering attached to a banca to protect the passengers from the sun and rain, made of nipa leaves and woven together.

History

Saint Catherine of Sienna became the patron of Samal, which was founded as a municipality on April 20, 1641.

"Sea gypsies" of Mindanao settlers ("Badjaos" who resided for many years in Maubac, Lambayung, Tanjung, Pata, Tapul, Lugus, Bangos, Pagasinan, Parang, Maimbung, Karugdung and Talipaw, Mindanao) migrated to Luzon in the early 14th century and settled in Bataan. In Samal, they propagated the pearl and capiz culture.

Samal was the second town founded by the Dominican friars in Bataan and is composed of four barrios: Calaguiman, Santa Lucia, Poblacion and Lalawigan.

Geography
Samal is located in the eastern part of Bataan Peninsula, bordering Abucay to the south, Orani to the north and northwest, Morong to the west, and Manila Bay to the east.

According to the Philippine Statistics Authority, the municipality has a land area of  constituting  of the  total area of Bataan.

Climate

Barangays
Samal is politically subdivided into 14 barangays.

Demographics

In the 2020 census, Samal had a population of 38,302.

Economy 

Composed largely of uplands and hills with some lowlands and plains, Samal's main produce are palay, corn, vegetable, fruits rootcrops, coffee and cutflowers, including livestock, poultry and aquatic resources such as shellfish, crabs, prawns, shrimps and different species of fish.

Joaquin Ma. Joson of Bataan established the first ice plant. Wooden shoe (bakya) making, and pulp mills (Bataan Pulp and Paper Mills, Inc. in the scenic slope of Mount Natib) are some of the industries of the natives. It also manufactures banana chips and arrow root flour through native processes, then made into cookies called araro as pasalubong. Samal is also rich is marine aquatic resources and highly productive farmlands.

Garments manufacturing in Samal is engaged in by five (5) firms already engaged in exports.

In the Town Hall of Samal and along the streets, Capiz shells are displayed to show that the town residents manufacture this commodity.

Government

Pursuant to the Local government in the Philippines", the political seat of the municipal government is located at the Municipal Hall. In the History of the Philippines (1521–1898), the Gobernadorcillo was the Chief Executive who held office in the Presidencia. During the American rule (1898–1946) (History of the Philippines (1898-1946)), the elected Mayor and local officials, including the appointed ones held office at the Municipal Hall. The legislative and executive departments perform their functions in the Sangguniang Bayan (Session Hall) and Municipal Trial Court, respectively, and are located in the Town Hall.

Elected officials
Samal's elected officials are - Mayor Alexander Carpio Acuzar (Liberal) and Vice Mayor Ronald Medina Ortiguerra (Liberal).

The Sangguniang Bayan Members are: Marjun Q. Bantay, Lolito S. Llanda, Erval V. Flores, Kathrina A. Saldaña, Dylan M. House, Evangeline G. Buensuceso, Edgardo I. De Leon and Jaime M. Manguiat. They hold office at the second floor of the Town Hall, particularly the Office of the Mayor and Sangguniang Bayan Session Hall, respectively.

The 2nd Municipal Circuit Trial Court of Orani-Samal MCTC Judge Ma. Cristina J. Mendoza-Pizzaro holds office in her sala located at the second floor of the MTC building at the back of the Orani Town hall.

Tourism
Samal's attractions, events and historical landmarks include:

 Senakulo sa Calaguiman during Holy Week
 Town Hall of Samal
 Samal Capiz shell industry
 Fish ponds, mangrove, mussels and seafoods in Samal bay

Parish Church of Saint Catherine of Siena

The 1596 Parish Church of Saint Catherine of Siena belongs to the Roman Catholic Diocese of Balanga (Dioecesis Balangensis - Part of the Ecclesiastical Province of San Fernando, Pampanga).

The Parish has a Catholic population of 11,581, under Titular of St. Catherine of Siena, with Feast day on April 30. Its former Parish Priest is Monsignor Edilfredo Cruz of the Vicariate of St. Dominic de Guzman. As of June 2011, Fr. Antonio David Bernaldo was assigned as new Parish Priest of the church.

The Dominicans in 1596 directed the spirituality of Samal. Attacked by Dutch invaders in April 1647, the local garrison of Pampanga under Alejo Aguas ousted the Dutch forces. Rev. Jeromino Belen, O.P. rebuilt the ruined church and the convent. In 1896 the Katipuneros burned the church and convent which were rebuilt by Rev. Justo Quesada in 1903.

Gallery

References

External links

[ Philippine Standard Geographic Code]

Municipalities of Bataan
Populated places on Manila Bay